The Buenos Aires Institute of Technology,  (Spanish: Instituto Tecnológico de Buenos Aires - ITBA) is an Argentine private university located in the city of Buenos Aires. Its focus is primarily on Information Technology, Business and Engineering studies.
In spite of being a small university, with only about 1650 undergraduate students, ITBA is regarded as one of the best engineering schools in Latin America, with an annual graduation average of 200 engineers, about 10% of the annual national total. ITBA maintains cooperation agreements with over 50 universities in 20 countries.

History

ITBA was created on November 20, 1959, by a group of Navy officers and professionals, with the purpose of advancing the teaching of engineering in Argentina. Its first rector was Viceadmiral Carlos Garzoni, followed by Viceadmiral , who served briefly as the Navy's Chief of Naval Operations in 1962.

The main building is located in the neighborhood of Puerto Madero, on the grounds of the old Argentine Navy Hospital.  The new campus is located in new southern Technological Hub of Buenos Aires, in the Parque Patricios neighbourhood.

Ranking
According to the QS World University Rankings, ITBA is the fifth best private university in the country and is ranked third in Buenos Aires.

See also 
 
Sabato Institute of Technology

References

External links
 Official website
 International Students Website

Private universities in Argentina
Education in Buenos Aires
Educational institutions established in 1959
Engineering universities and colleges in Argentina
Buildings and structures in Buenos Aires
Universities in Buenos Aires Province
1959 establishments in Argentina